Santosh, also spelled as Santhosh, is a Hindu masculine given name. The name means "Confidence" or "Leader".

Notable people with the given name Santosh

 Santosh Bagrodia, former MP, politician representing INC
 Santosh Bhattacharyya (1924–2011), Bengali scholar
 Santosh Chandra Bhattacharyya (1915–1971), lecturer
 Santosh Chowdhary (born 1944), member of Lok Sabha, politician representing INC
 Santosh Dutta, Bengali actor
 Santhosh Echikkanam, contemporary short story writer from Kerala
 Santosh Gangwar (born 1948), India politician representing BJP, former MP
 Santhosh George Kulangara (born 1971), cinematographer and travel writer
 Santhosh Jogi (died 2010), Malayalam film actor and singer
 Santosh Joshi (born 1960), classical vocalist and instrumentalist
 Santosh Juvekar, Marathi film, television and stage actor
 Santosh Kashyap (born 1966), football coach
 Santosh Kumar (1925–1982), name by which the Pakistani film actor Syed Musa Raza was popularly known as
 Santosh Kumar Ghosh (1920–1985), Bengali writer and journalist
 Santosh Kumar Gupta (1936–1991), former Indian Navy admiral, recipient of Maha Vir Chakra
 Santosh Kumar Shukla, social worker, represented INC
 Santosh Lad (born 1975), politician representing INC, MLA from Karnataka
 Santosh Madhavan (born 1960), Godman from Kerala serving prison sentence for crimes conducted
 Santosh Marray, Assistant Bishop of the Episcopal Diocese of Alabama
 Santosh Mohan Dev (born 1934), political leader, represents INC, former MPs
 Santhosh Narayanan (born 1983), Tamil film composer and musician
 Santhosh Pandit, Malayalam film actor
 Santosh Rana, politician, general secretary of Provisional Central Committee, CPI (ML), and former MLA
 Santosh Rana (CPI), politician representing CPI, former MLA
 Santosh Sahukhala (born 1988), Nepali international football player
 Santosh Saroj, Bollywood screenwriter
 Santosh Shah, Masterchef contestant
 Santosh Sivan (born 1964), cinematographer and film director from Kerala
 Santosh Srinivas, film director
 Santosh Thundiyil, cinematographer from Kerala
 Santosh Vempala (born 1971), computer scientist
 Santosh Yadav (born 1967), mountaineer
 Anop Santosh (born 1991), Pakistani cricket player
 Arunadhati Santosh Ghosh (born 1960), former cricketer
 D. Santosh (born 1976), film and theatre actor from Mumbai
 Ghulam Rasool Santosh (1929–1997), Kashmiri painter
 Kolli Santosh Ravindranath (born 1983), screenplay and story writer in Telugu and Kannada films
 N. Santosh Hegde (born 1940), Indian jurist, former Supreme Court justice
 Sanigaram Santosh Reddy (born 1942), political leader, former MLA
 T. V. Santhosh (born 1968), artist
 V. Santhosh Kumar (born 1991), amateur boxer

References

Indian given names
Nepalese given names